The Tianjin–Shijiazhuang Expressway, designated as G0211 and commonly abbreviated as Jinshi Expressway is an expressway in northeastern China linking the cities of Tianjin and Shijiazhuang, the capital city of Hebei.  This expressway is a branch of G2 Jinghu Expressway.

Route

References

Expressways in Hebei
Expressways in Tianjin
0211